Daunabotys is a genus of moths of the family Crambidae. It contains only one species, Daunabotys bipunctalis, which is found in Namibia.

References

Pyraustinae
Crambidae genera